Rask (also Romanized as Rāsk and Rāsak) is a village in Golzar Rural District, in the Central District of Bardsir County, Kerman Province, Iran. At the 2006 census, its population was 107, in 22 families.

References 

Populated places in Bardsir County